Antonello da Messina (1430February 1479), properly Antonello di Giovanni di Antonio, but also called Antonello degli Antoni and Anglicized as Anthony of Messina, was an Italian painter from Messina, active during the Early Italian Renaissance. His work shows strong influences from Early Netherlandish painting, although there is no documentary evidence that he ever travelled beyond Italy. Giorgio Vasari credited him with the introduction of oil painting into Italy, although this is now disputed. Unusually for a southern Italian artist of the Renaissance, his work proved influential on painters in northern Italy, especially in Venice.

Biography

Early life and training

Antonello was born at Messina around 1429–1431, to Garita (Margherita) and Giovanni de Antonio Mazonus, a sculptor who trained him early on. He and his family resided in the Sicofanti district of the city.

Antonello is thought to have apprenticed in Rome before going to Naples, where Netherlandish painting was then fashionable. According to a letter written in 1524 by the Neapolitan humanist Pietro Summonte, in about 1450 Antonello was a pupil of the painter Niccolò Colantonio in Naples. This account of his training is accepted by most art historians.

Early career
Antonello returned to Messina from Naples during the 1450s. In around 1455, he painted the so-called Sibiu Crucifixion, inspired by Flemish treatments of the subject, which is now in the Muzeul de Artǎ in Bucharest. A Crucifixion in the Royal Museum of Antwerp dates from the same period. These early works shows a marked Flemish influence, which is now understood to be inspired by his master Colantonio and from paintings by Rogier van der Weyden and Jan van Eyck that belonged to Colantonio's patron, Alfonso V of Aragon. 

In his biography of the artist, Giorgio Vasari remarked that Antonello saw an oil painting by Van Eyck (the Lomellini Tryptych) belonging to King Alfonso V of Aragon at Naples and consequently introduced oil painting to Italy. Recent evidence indicates that an "Antonello di Sicilia" (di Sicilia meaning 'from Sicily') was in contact with Van Eyck's most accomplished follower, Petrus Christus, in Milan in early 1456. It appears likely that this was in fact Antonello da Messina as this would explain why he was one of the first Italians to master Eyckian oil painting, and why Christus was the first Netherlandish painter to learn Italian linear perspective. Antonello's paintings after that date show an observation of almost microscopic detail and of minute gradations of light on reflecting or light absorbent objects that is very close to the style of the Netherlandish masters, suggesting that Antonello was personally instructed by Christus. Also, the calmer expressions on human faces and calmness in the overall composition of Antonello's works appear to be owing to a Netherlandish influence. He is believed to have shared Van Eyck's techniques with Gentile and Giovanni Bellini.

Between the years of 1456 and 1457, Antonello proved himself to be a master painter in Messina. He also shared his home with Paolo di Ciacio, a student from Calabria. The artist's earliest documented commission, in 1457, was for a banner for the Confraternità di San Michele dei Gerbini in Reggio Calabria, where he set up a workshop for the production of such banners and devotional images. At this date, he was already married, and his son Jacobello had been born.

In 1460, his father is mentioned leasing a brigantine to bring back Antonello and his family from Amantea in Calabria. In that year, Antonello painted the so-called Salting Madonna, in which standard iconography and Flemish style are combined with a greater attention in the volumetric proportions of the figures, probably indicating a knowledge of works by Piero della Francesca. Also from around 1460 are two small panels depicting Abraham Served by the Angels and St. Jerome Penitent now in the Museo Nazionale della Magna Grecia in Reggio Calabria. In 1461 Antonello's younger brother Giordano entered his workshop, signing a three-year contract.  In that year Antonello painted a Madonna with Child for the Messinese nobleman Giovanni Mirulla, now lost.

Historians believe that Antonello painted his first portraits in the late 1460s. They follow a Netherlandish model, the subject being shown bust-length, against a dark background, full face or in three-quarter view,  while most previous Italian painters had adopted the medal-style  profile pose for individual portraits.  John Pope-Hennessy described him as "the first Italian  painter for whom the individual portrait was an art form in its own right".

Although Antonello is mentioned in many documents between 1460 and 1465, establishing his presence in Messina in those years, a gap in the sources between 1465 and 1471 suggests  that he may have spent these years on the mainland.  In 1474, he painted the Annunciation, now in Syracuse, and  the St. Jerome in His Study also dates from around this time.

Venice
Antonello went to Venice in 1475 and remained there until the fall of 1476. His works of this period begin to show a greater attention to the human figure, regarding both anatomy and expressivity, indicating the influence of Piero della Francesca and Giovanni Bellini. His most famous pictures  from this period include the Condottiero (Louvre), the San Cassiano Altarpiece and the St. Sebastian. The San Cassiano Altarpiece was especially influential on Venetian painters, as it was one of the first of the large compositions in the sacra conversazione format which was perfected by Giovanni Bellini (Antonello's surviving work in Vienna is only a fragment of a much larger original). It is also likely that Antonello passed on both the techniques of using oil paints and the principles of calmness on subjects' faces and in the composition of paintings to Giovanni Bellini and other Venetian painters during that visit. While in Venice he was offered, but did not accept, the opportunity to become the court portrait painter to the Duke of Milan.

Return to Messina and death
Antonello had returned to Sicily by September 1476. Works from near the end of his life include the famous Virgin Annunciate, now in the Palazzo Abatellis in Palermo, and the San Gregorio Polyptych.

He died at Messina in 1479. His testament dates from February of that year, and he is documented as no longer alive two months later. Some of his last works remained unfinished, but were completed by his son Jacobello.

Style and legacy
Antonello's style is remarkable for its union of Italian simplicity with Flemish concern for detail. He exercised an enormous influence on Italian painting, not only by the introduction of the Flemish invention, but also by the transmission of Flemish tendencies. However, no school of painting formed after his death, with the exception of the Sicilian Marco Costanzo.

Selected works
Sibiu Crucifixion (1455) - Muzeul de Artà, Bucharest
Abraham Served by the Angels - Museo della Magna Grecia, Reggio Calabria
Portrait of a Man (1460s) - Oil on wood, Civic Museums, Pavia
Ecce Homo (c. 1470) - Tempera and oil on  panel, 42.5 x 30.5 cm, Metropolitan Museum of Art, New York City
Ecce Homo (1470) - Tempera and oil on  panel, 40 x 33 cm, Galleria Nazionale di Palazzo Spinola, Genoa
St. Jerome Penitent - Various techniques on wood, 40.2 x 30.2 cm, Museo della Magna Grecia, Reggio Calabria
San Gregorio Polyptych (1473) - Tempera on panel, 194 x 202 cm, Regional Museum, Messina
Ecce Homo (c. 1473) - Tempera on panel, 19.5 x 14.3 cm, Private collection, New York City
Portrait of a Man (1474) - Oil on wood, Staatliche Museen, Berlin
Madonna with Child (Salting Madonna) - Oil on wood, 43.2 x 34.3 cm, National Gallery, London
Portrait of a Man (1474) - Oil on wood, 32 x 26 cm, Staatliche Museen, Berlin
Annunciation (1474) - Oil on panel, 180 x 180 cm, Bellomo Palace Regional Gallery,  Syracuse
St. Jerome in His Study (c. 1474) - Oil on wood, 46 x 36,5 cm, National Gallery, London
Ecce Homo (1475) - Oil on  panel, 48.5 x 38 cm, Collegio Alberoni, Piacenza
Portrait of a Man (Il Condottiere) (1475) - Oil on wood, 35 x 38 cm, Musée du Louvre, Paris
Crucifixion (1455) - Oil on panel 52.5 x 42.5 cm, Koninklijk Museum voor Schone Kunsten, Antwerp
Crucifixion (1475) - Wood, 42 x 25,5 cm, National Gallery, London
Portrait of a Man (c. 1475) - Oil on wood, Galleria Borghese, Rome
Portrait of a Man (c. 1475) - Oil on panel, 36 x 25 cm, National Gallery, London
Portrait of a Man (1475–1476) - Oil on panel, 28 x 21 cm, Museo Thyssen-Bornemisza, Madrid
San Cassiano Altarpiece (1475–76) - Oil on panel, Kunsthistorisches Museum, Vienna
The Dead Christ Supported by an Angel (1475–78) - Panel, 74 x 51 cm, Museo del Prado, Madrid
Christ at the Column (c. 1475–1479) - Oil on wood, 25,8 x 21 cm, Musée du Louvre, Paris
Virgin of the Annunciation -Oil on panel, Alte Pinakothek, Munich
Portrait of a Man (1476) - Oil on panel, Museo Civico d'Arte Antica, Turin
Virgin of the Annunciation (c. 1476) - Oil on wood, 45 x 34,5 cm, Museo Nazionale, Palermo
St. Sebastian (1477–1479) - Oil on canvas transferred from panel, 171 × 85 cm, Gemäldegalerie Alte Meister, Dresden
Portrait of a Young Man (c. 1478) - Panel, 20.4 x 14.5 cm, Staatliche Museeun, Berlin
Portrait of an unknown man - Oil on panel, Museo Mandralisca, Cefalù
Madonna and Child - Oil and tempera on panel transferred from panel, National Gallery of Art, Washington, D.C.

References

Sources
  (online).
 Christiansen, Keith. “Antonello da Messina (ca. 1430–1479).” In Heilbrunn Timeline of Art History. New York: The Metropolitan Museum of Art, 2000–. (March 2010)

External links

Antonello da Messina in the "History of Art"
Antonello da Messina – Biography and Works
Best of Sicily Magazine article on Antonello da Messina and the technique of egg tempera / oil media

Web Gallery of Art
Guardian article on Portrait of a Man
Petrus Christus: Renaissance master of Bruges, a full text exhibition catalog from The Metropolitan Museum of Art, which contains material on Antonello da Messina (see index)

Italian Renaissance painters
Quattrocento painters
1430s births
1479 deaths
Italian male painters
Italian portrait painters
Painters from Messina
Kingdom of Sicily people
15th-century Italian painters
Catholic painters